A tar pit is a geological occurrence where subterranean bitumen leaks to the surface, creating a large puddle, pit, or lake of asphalt.

Tarpit may also refer to:
 "Tar Pit" (Land of the Lost), an episode of the 1974 series Land of the Lost
 Tar Pit (comics), a fictional supervillain in DC Comics
 Tarpit (networking), information security and anti-spam techniques in networking
 Turing tarpit, a type of programming language